Birendra Prasad Singh (Nepali: बिरेन्द्र प्रसाद सिंह) is a Nepalese politician who is member of Provincial Assembly of Madhesh Province. Singh, a resident of Sarlahi was elected to the 2017 provincial assembly elections due to backing from Nepali Congress then leader Amresh Kumar Singh from Sarlahi-4(A). 

He was the Minister for Youth, Women, Children and Sports for Madhesh Province, Nepal. He has been most controversial Madesh leader and has been thrashed by the cadres of his own party members multiple times due to his mis-behaviour and foul languages. He is also regarded as most corrupted leaders from Madesh Pradesh and has done multiple corruption scams with his contractor brother Surendra Prasad Singh who has been sentenced to prison and fines by Special Court and Supreme Court of Nepal. He including 2 other joined as minister from Nepali Congress after a group of ministers were expelled from province government due to intra party dispute in ruling PSP-N to save Lalbabu Raut led government. He is a leader close to NC Vice-president Bimalendra Nidhi.

Electoral history 
Provincial Assembly election 2021

See also
Nepali Congress, Madhesh Province
Bimalendra Nidhi
Ram Saroj Yadav
Amresh Kumar Singh
Lalbabu Raut cabinet

References 

Living people
People from Sarlahi District
Nepali Congress politicians from Madhesh Province
1978 births
Provincial cabinet ministers of Nepal
Members of the Provincial Assembly of Madhesh Province